Joe Doyle (February 27, 1941 – April 7, 2020) was an American artist. He is one of the original painters in the style, abstract illusionism, of the 1970s and has since evolved his style using computerized technologies to create Digital art.

Life and work 
Doyle established himself as a painter during the movement toward new abstraction in San Francisco in the mid-seventies. Stylistically his work evolved from photo-realist renderings of aircraft which exaggerated differences in focus of background and foreground". By 1975 his imagery shifted to arrangements of flat, geometric forms and tubular squiggles in a trompe-l'œil manner that created the illusion of a multi-layered, three dimensional space. By the late 1970s Doyle, along with James Havard, Jack Reilly and others, had attained national prominence working this style now referred to as Abstract Illusionism. Doyle and others were included in 'Reality of Illusion' a large touring exhibition of primarily American illusionist artists organized by the University of Southern California and The Denver Art Museum.

According to an interview by Mark Levy in the January/February, 1982 issue of Art Voices, Doyle began his artistic career in the Air Force, where Doyle says he was relieved of difficult assignments and encouraged to paint by a sergeant who appreciated his realistic landscape paintings. When he began painting abstractly, however, the sergeant relegated him to K.P. duty. Following the Air Force Doyle enrolled at San Francisco State College receiving his M.A. in 1971. From 1971 to 1975 he was a photo-realist transferring images from photographs using airbrush techniques on canvas, occasionally adding political satire into the subject matter, as in "Ice House (1971).

Doyle was an instructor and co-founder of the Multi-Media Arts Department at Berkeley City College. In 2010 then Berkeley Mayor Tom Bates and the Berkeley City Council recognized Doyle and the Berkeley City College’s Digital Arts Club (DAC) for "its talent, creativity, and its many years of artistic contributions to Bay Area galleries and exhibits.". 
His most recent work delves into the realm of both 3-D realism and 3-D non-objective abstraction. In 2017 he released a new series titled "New Abstracts" employing the use of 3-D modeling and color fields to create an illusion of 3-dimensional space.

In early 2020 Joe experienced coronary issues and underwent heart surgery. Complications during recovery led to pneumonia and what doctors believed to be COVID-19, he Died on April 7, 2020. A memorial page can be found at ForeverMissed.com.

Solo exhibitions

Nuage, Environment for Contemporary Art, Los Angeles 1977
Foster Goldstrom Fine Arts, San Francisco, CA Foster Goldstrom Fine Arts, San Francisco
San Jose Museum of Fine Art, San Jose 1979
O. K. Harris West, Scottsdale 1981
Route 66 Gallery, Philadelphia, PA Foster Goldstrom Fine Arts, San Francisco 1982
Foster Goldstrom Fine Arts, San Francisco  1983
Route 66 Gallery, Philadelphia 1984
Foster Goldstrom Gallery, Dallas  1985
J. Rosenthal Fine Arts, Chicago  1985
Illinois Metropolitan Center, Chicago 1986
"Joe Doyle New Work", Harcourts Contemporary, San Francisco 1988
Kennedy Art Center, Holy Names College, Oakland 1990
Harcourt's Contemporary Gallery, San Francisco  1991 
Artists Gallery, San Francisco 2008

Group exhibitions

"Arts and Industry," Brooks Hall, San Francisco 1971
"Options 73/30,· Contemporary Ar~ Center, Cincinnati 1973
San Jose Museum of Art, San Jose 1975
"Art for Collecting and Giving,· San Francisco Museum of Modern Art, San Francisco 1977
"Six East Bay Painters," Oakland Museum of Art, Oakland 1977
"The Annual," San Francisco Art Institute, San Francisco 1977
"Bay Area Artist, Oakland Museum of Art, Oakland 1977
Aesthetics of Graffiti," San Francisco Museum of Modern Art, San Francisco 1978
"Reality of Illusion,· University of Southern California, Touring Show 1979
Selections from the Contemporary Art Collection of the Oakland Museum," Kaiser Center, Oakland 1980
"George Irwin Collection, Krannert Museum, IL 1980
Palo Alto Cultural Center, Palo Alto 1980
"The Controlled Gesture -Aspects of Bay Area Abstraction," 1980
Midwestern Museum of Art, Elkhorn, IN 1981
"The Goldstrom Collection", Davenport Art Center, Davenport, IA (National tour) 1988
"Four from California," Yozo Ueda Gallery, Tokyo 1988 
Art of Jingletown, Oakland Museum of California, Oakland 2006
Printing on the Edge, Alameda Historical Museum, Alameda, CA 2009
Thinking Big, Gualala Art Center, Gualala, CA 2009
Oakland Symphony Showcase, Oakland 2010

See also
Abstract Illusionism

References

External links 
Joe Doyle artist website
The Art of Joe Doyle
AskArt.com
ForeverMissed.com Memorial Page

1941 births
2020 deaths
20th-century American painters
American male painters
21st-century American painters
21st-century American male artists
San Francisco State University alumni
Painters from New York City
20th-century American male artists